Broadgate Park is a self-catered hall of residence at the University of Nottingham, accommodating under-graduate and post-graduate students. Housing about 2400 students and containing 2,223 rooms, it is one of the largest student villages in Europe.  It is located outside of the West Entrance of the University Park campus. It is owned and maintained by University Partnerships Programme. The warden is Dr Anna Pelekanou.

Block names
The majority of blocks in Broadgate Park have botanical names such as those of various trees or flowers.

History
In 2009 UPP announced a £115 million transaction with the University of Nottingham. Under this agreement UPP agreed to provide  850 student bedrooms.

Under an agreement between UPP and the University of Nottingham ownership of the accommodation will be transferred to the University in the year 2047/48.

JCR
The Broadgate Park JCR represents the residents of Broadgate Park, as well as Albion House, in nearby Beeston and Cloister House, in Dunkirk — two other third-party halls owned by UPP Broadgate Park.

See also
University of Nottingham Halls of Residence

References

External links

Official website
Facebook group

University of Nottingham
Halls of residence in the United Kingdom